The ochre-cheeked spinetail (Synallaxis scutata) is a species of bird in the family Furnariidae. It is found in Bolivia, Brazil and northwestern Argentina. Its natural habitats are subtropical or tropical dry forests and subtropical or tropical moist lowland forests.

References

ochre-cheeked spinetail
Birds of the Gran Chaco
Birds of Bolivia
Birds of Brazil
ochre-cheeked spinetail
ochre-cheeked spinetail
Taxonomy articles created by Polbot